Dave Syrett (20 January 1956 – 26 July 2016) was an English footballer who played in the Football League for Swindon Town, Mansfield Town, Walsall, Peterborough United, and Northampton Town.

Syrett died on 26 July 2016 in Salisbury, England from a brain tumor. He was 60.

References

External links
 

English footballers
English Football League players
1956 births
2016 deaths
Swindon Town F.C. players
Mansfield Town F.C. players
Walsall F.C. players
Peterborough United F.C. players
Northampton Town F.C. players
Salisbury City F.C. players
Association football forwards